Operation Wonderland may refer to:

Operation Wunderland, the German World War 2 naval operation in the Arctic
Operation Wonderland, the military operation in the Iraq War